Romario da Silva Resende known as Romario (born 3 December 1990, in São Paulo) is a Brazilian football forward.

He previously played for Beroe Stara Zagora in Bulgaria. On 7 May he scored his single goal for the club in a 3-1 away win against Akademik Sofia.

External links
 Profile

1990 births
Living people
Brazilian footballers
Brazilian expatriate footballers
PFC Beroe Stara Zagora players
First Professional Football League (Bulgaria) players
Brazilian expatriate sportspeople in Bulgaria
Expatriate footballers in Bulgaria
Association football midfielders
Footballers from São Paulo